Rutgers v. Waddington was a case held in the New York City Mayor's Court in 1784 that set a precedent for the concept of judicial review in the United States.  The case was controversial, and after the court's ruling the New York Legislature passed a vote of censure on the court.

Background 
After the American Revolutionary War, the New York State legislature enacted a series of laws that stripped Tories, opponents of the revolution, of their property and privilege. One such law passed by the legislature in 1783 was the Trespass Act, which gave Patriots, supporters of the revolution, the legal right to sue anyone who had occupied, damaged, or destroyed homes that they had left behind British lines during the war. That law served as the foundation for this case.

Arguments
Rutgers v. Waddington was presented on June 29, 1784 before Chief Justice James Duane and four additional aldermen. The plaintiff, Elizabeth Rutgers, owned a large brewery and alehouse that she was forced to abandon during the British occupation of New York City. Under the recently-enacted Trespass Act, Rutgers demanded rent by the sum of £8,000 from Joshua Waddington, who was running the brewery ever since it had been abandoned.

The defense's case was litigated by Alexander Hamilton, who posited that the Trespass Act violated the Treaty of Paris (1783), which had been ratified by the US Congress. Hamilton decided that the case would be a good test of ruling the legality of the Trespass Act.

Decision and legacy 
Duane handed down a split verdict, which quickly resulted in censure by the New York legislature. The ruling entitled Rutgers to rent only from the time before the British occupation, and both parties agreed to the amount of £800. Pecuniary issues aside, the case more importantly set a precedent for Congress's legal authority over the states and the limitations of judicial review. Duane wrote in his ruling that "no state in this union can alter or abridge, in a single point, the federal articles or the treaty."  Additionally, according to William Treanor of Georgetown University Law Center the Rutgers case concluded, "Judges cannot 'reject' a clearly expressed statute simply because it is 'unreasonable'".  Duane wrote:

The supremacy of the legislature need not be called into question; if they think fit positively to enact a law, there is no power which can control them. When the main object of such a law is clearly expressed, and the intention manifest, the judges are not at liberty, although it appears to them to be unreasonable, to reject it; for this were to set the judicial above the legislative, which would be subversive of all government.

According to the historian Shannon C. Stimson, the reason for the censure was "not legislative intent, but legislative power and whether any legitimate authority existed which might challenge the majority will."

Several scholars believe that Rutgers "was a template for the interpretive approach he [Hamilton] adopted in Federalist No. 78."

References

External links 

 Internet Archive - The case of Elizabeth Rutgers versus Joshua Waddington

Legal history of New York (state)
1784 in case law
1784 in New York (state)